was a classically trained baritone and a famous singer of popular music in early Shōwa era Japan.

Life and career
Tokuyama was born to a medical practitioner on July 27, 1903, in a village in Kanagawa Prefecture's Kōza District, west of Yokohama. After completing high school, Tokuyama enrolled in the Tokyo School of Music (later part of the Tokyo University of the Arts). Upon completing his studies there, he became a faculty member of the Musashino Academia Musicae.

He accompanied  as a piano player, who was also a graduate from Tokyo University of Arts. Satō became the first female best selling ryūkōka singer soon after the radio broadcasting began in 1925 and had a contract with Nippon Victor Company.

In 1930 Tokuyama was signed a record contract with Nippon Victor Company where he would remain for the rest of his life. His song Samurai Nippon (侍ニッポン)—its lyrics based on an eponymous novel by Jirōmasa Gunji that was popular at the time—became a hit in 1931, a success that was followed shortly thereafter with the comic song Runpen Bushi (ルンペン節; "runpen" is adapted from the German word for "rag" or "vagrant"). The humorous lyrics and operetta-like quality of the song earned it wide popularity and made Tokuyama one of Nippon Victor Company's biggest singing stars of the 1930s.

In 1932 he recorded a duet with Fumiko Yotsuya called Tengoku ni musubu koi (天國に結ぶ戀; trans. "A Love Bound in Heaven"), which was inspired by a notorious double suicide that had occurred in Sakatayama earlier that year.

Later Tokuyama became a noted exponent of gunka, recording very popular renditions of such songs as the Hinomaru March (日の丸行進曲) and Patriotic March (愛國行進曲). In early 1940s he released a propaganda song Tonarigumi (隣組; trans; "Neighborhood Association") promoting the home front, though the song itself has been covered by artists with subsequently altered lyrics. LP and CD reissues of his work in subsequent decades have tended to focus on his recordings in this genre.

Tokuyama was also a famous film and theatrical actor, often appearing together with his friend, the comedian Roppa Furukawa and his troop, in musical films what they called "Cine-operetta" (operetta movie) in the early 1930s, with best known Utau Yajikita (歌ふ弥次喜多 trans. "Operetta Yaji and Kita"). That program led them to perform in 1935 at Yūrakuza the most prestigious theater in central Tokyo then with guest performance by Fujiwara Yoshie.

For theatrical performances those popular programs as Tōkaidōchū Hizakurige (東海道中膝栗毛) and Garamasadon ( ガラマサどん) made them very popular. As a singer with classical music background, he did not hesitate to include comic songs Marumarubushi (マルマル節) with Roppa Furukawa. It was his vocal part that attracted their audience as Tokuyama's singing style was so distinctive that not many audience heard before, while the idea of singing songs was to apply traditional vocalization called "kobushi" that other ryūkōka singers were used to.

He also continued his career as a classical singer of opera, lieder, and chansons; making notable appearances in Japanese productions of Carmen and Hansel and Gretel, as well as singing the bass part in performances of Beethoven's Symphony No. 9. Though his career as a classical singer was an important part of Tokuyama's life, it remains mostly unknown as he cut very few classical records and none of them have ever been reissued outside of the original 78s.

He died prematurely from complications from sepsis on January 28, 1942, at the age of 38. Tokuyama is buried in the graveyard of the Jōkō-ji in Fujisawa.

Select discography

 Tatake taiko (叩け太鼓 Beating the Drum) 1930
 Aika (哀歌 Jules Massenet's Élégie sung in Japanese, with Kunihiko Hashimoto on violin) 1931
 Samurai Nippon (侍ニッポン Samurai Japan) 1931
 Runpen bushi (ルンペン節 Free-loader's Tune) 1931
 Tengoku ni musubu koi (天國に結ぶ戀 A Love Bound in Heaven) 1932
 Yoru no sakaba ni (夜の酒場に Night at the Bar) 1932
 Koi ni naku (戀に泣く Tearful in Love) 1933
 Aikoku Kōshinkyoku (愛國行進曲 Patriotic March) 1937
 Sararīman-yo (サラリーマンよ Oh Salaryman) 1937
 Maru-maru bushi (〇〇ぶし) 1938
 Hinomaru kōshinkyoku (日の丸行進曲 Hinomaru March) 1938
 Tonarigumi (隣組 Neighborhood Association) 1940

Bibliography
  World Music Classes Series 4,40. Non-commercial, could be the text book for his classes at Musashino Academia Musicae.

Filmography

He performed in almost 10 films.

Opera performances
February 28, 1932 Cavalleria rusticana, Alfio, a carter. （Hibiya Hall）
December 17, 1934, and January 20, 1935. Hansel and Gretel, Father. (Banquet Hall, Imperial Hotel at Hibiya)
March 24–26, 1935 at the Friday Concerts Carmen, bull fighter Escamillo.（Army Officers' Hall at Kudanshita） 
August 2–16, 1935 Carmen, Escamillo.  (Yūrakuza Hall)

Footnotes

Musicians from Kanagawa Prefecture
Japanese baritones
20th-century Japanese male opera singers
Tokyo Music School alumni
1903 births
1942 deaths
Deaths from sepsis